Gorczenica  is a village in the administrative district of Gmina Brodnica, within Brodnica County, Kuyavian-Pomeranian Voivodeship, in north-central Poland.

Historically, it belonged to Michałów Land.

References

Gorczenica